Vampires of Warsaw (Polish: Wampiry Warszawy) is a 1925 Polish silent crime film directed by Wiktor Biegański and starring Oktawian Kaczanowski, Halina Labedzka and Maria Balcerkiewiczówna. It was Biegański's most popular film, and displayed the influence of Soviet cinema on his work. The film is considered lost, so it's difficult to describe the plot in detail, but the film appears to have been a murder mystery whodunit and did not actually feature any vampires of the supernatural variety.

Actor Igo Sym, who later shared billing in films with top name stars like Marlene Dietrich, became a Nazi informant in WWII and turned in a number of fellow Polish actors and theater owners who were aligned with the Resistance forces in Poland. In 1941, some Polish freedom fighters assassinated Sym, and the Nazis retaliated by executing 21 hostages and sending dozens of others to Auschwitz.

Cast
 Oktawian Kaczanowski as Pradowski 
 Halina Łabędzka as Urszula Pradowska 
 Maria Balcerkiewiczówna as Countess Tamarska 
 Igo Sym as Tadeusz Wyzewicz, lawyer 
 Lech Owron as Baron Kamiłow 
 Marian Kiernicki as Antoni, lokaj 
 Wiera Pogorzanka as Tonia 
 Katarzyna Dworkowska as Przelozona klasztoru 
 Piotr Hryniewicz as Prosecutor 
 K. Marczewski as Lichwiarz

References

Bibliography
 Haltof, Marek. Polish National Cinema. Berghahn Books, 2002.

External links

1925 films
1925 crime films
Polish crime films
Polish silent films
1920s Polish-language films
Films directed by Wiktor Bieganski
Films set in Warsaw
Polish black-and-white films